Sofie van den Enk (born 23 August 1980 born in Heemskerk) is a Dutch television presenter who currently works for the KRO. Sofie graduated in 2006 from the University of Groningen and holds a master's degree in American Studies.

In early 2006, she began working as a reporter for regional television, RTV Utrecht, and later on she presented the daily newsmagazine of that channel called 'U Vandaag' (You Today). In 2007 and 2008 she also presented a program called 'Villa Hooiberg'.

In late 2008, 11 December, she won an award, Philip Bloemendal Award, for young presenters, the first presenter from regional television. Sinds 2009, works as a presenter on the public broadcasting organisation KRO.

She became a mother in 2011.

TV appearances

KRO 
 Ouders hebben geen Seks (2009)
 Geld speelt geen rol (2009)
 Hints (2010)
 Door 1 Deur (2010)
 PS Radio (2010 - )
 De Rekenkamer (2011 - )
 XXL (2011)
 Seinpost Den Haag (2011)

RTV Utrecht 
 U Vandaag (2006–2010)
 Villa Hooiberg (2007 & 2008)
 Goed voor Elkaar (2008–2009)
 Uit met Sofie (2010)

VARA 
 De Wereld Draait Door / Jakhalzen (2008–2009)

TV Gelderland 
 Goed voor Elkaar (2010)

External links
 
 www.sofievandenenk.nl Website of Sofie van den Enk
 Sofie van den Enk at www.beeldengeluidwiki.nl

1980 births
Living people
Dutch television presenters
Dutch women television presenters
People from Heemskerk
21st-century Dutch women